, abbreviated , is Japan's largest and oldest labor union of teachers and school staff. The union is known for its critical stance against the conservative Liberal Democratic Party government on such issues as Kimigayo (the national anthem), the Flag of Japan, and the screening of history textbooks since its near continuous one-party rule since 1945. It is affiliated to the trade union confederation Rengo. It had 290,857 members as of December 2009.

History
Established in 1947, it was the largest teachers union until a split in the late 1980s. The union functioned as a national federation of prefectural teachers unions, although each of these unions had considerable autonomy and its own strengths and political orientation. Historically, there had been considerable antagonism between the union and the Ministry of Education, owing to a variety of factors. Some were political, because the stance of the union had been strongly leftist and it often opposed the more conservative Liberal Democratic Party. Another factor was the trade union perspective that the teachers union had on the profession of teaching. Additional differences on education issues concerned training requirements for new teachers, decentralization in education, school autonomy, curricula, textbook censorship, and, in the late 1980s, the reform movement.

Karel van Wolferen describes the historical clashes between the Ministry of Education and the Union in The Enigma of Japanese Power (e.g., former Ministers coming from the Naimusho "Thought Police" of the 1930s, using thugs to systematically attack Union members and union meetings and eliminate elected Boards of Education).

The union tended to support the Japan Socialist Party, while a minority faction supported the Japanese Communist Party. In the late 1980s, internal disagreements in the Japan Teachers Union on political orientation and on the union's relationships to other national labor organizations finally caused a rupture. The union thus became less effective than in previous years at a time when the national government and the Ministry were moving ahead on reform issues. The union had opposed many reforms proposed or instituted by the ministry, but it failed to forestall changes in certification and teacher training, two issues on which it was often at odds with the government. The new union leadership that emerged after several years of internal discord seemed to take a more conciliatory approach to the ministry and reform issues, but the union's future directions were not clear.

The National Union of General Workers (Zenkoku Ippan Rodo Kumiai) serves as the largest union representing foreign and migrant education workers in Japan.

Presidents
1947: Araki Shozaburo
1950: Oka Saburo
1952: Takeshi Kobayashi
1962: Miyanohara Sadamitsu
1971: Motofumi Makieda
1983: Shoju Ohba
1990s:
2004: Yasuo Morikoshi
2008: Yuzuru Nakamura
2012: Ryosuke Kato

See also

Education in Japan
Ministry of Education, Culture, Sports, Science and Technology
Japanese history textbook controversies
Japanese Society for History Textbook Reform
Ienaga Saburo
Kimi Ga Yo
Flag of Japan
National Union of General Workers
Azuma Koshiishi

References

  - Japan

External links
Japan Teachers Union Homepage (in Japanese)
Japan Teachers Union Homepage (in English)
National Union of General Workers (in English) 
University Teachers Union (in English)

Trade unions in Japan
Education in Japan
Education trade unions
Trade unions established in 1947
Teaching in Japan